Aubourn Haddington and South Hykeham was a former civil parish in the North Kesteven district of Lincolnshire, England.  According to the 2001 census it had a population of 885.

The parish included the villages of Aubourn, Haddington and South Hykeham.  The A46 (the old Fosse Way) formed the north-western border of the parish.

The composite parish was formed on 1 April 1931 from the separate parishes of Aubourn, Haddington, and South Hykeham   and dissolved in 1991 to become two separate parishes: Aubourn and Haddington and South Hykeham.

The dissolution order seems not to have been propagated thoroughly: GIS based national databases still use Aubourn Haddington and South Hykeham as though it is a current parish.  Examples include the 2001 census and English Heritage's Pastscape database.

References

Note: also affected by the central GIS error

External links

Former civil parishes in Lincolnshire
North Kesteven District